"Follow" / "Swallow" is the fourth single by English electronic band Crystal Fighters from their album Star of Love. The double A-side was released on 27 September 2010 through Zirkulo records, to positive reviews.
 
"Follow" was also featured on EA Sports FIFA 13.

Music video
The music video for "Follow" was directed by Ian Pons Jewell and "Swallow" by Tobias Stretch.

Track listing

Reception
The single received positive coverage in the media, with Laura of Glasswerk magazine positively reviewing both singles and describing the tracks as "Jubilant and effervescent"
James Canham, of ThisIsFakeDIY, mirrors this view, stating:
And had this to say of "Swallow":

Charts

References

2010 singles
Crystal Fighters songs
2010 songs